The biodiversity of Wales (Welsh: Bioamrywiaeth Cymru) refers to the wide variety of ecosystems, living organisms, and the genetic makeups found in Wales.

Wales is a predominantly mountainous peninsula located between England and the Irish Sea, covering 8,023 square miles. It has terrestrial habitats and many protected areas rich in biodiversity, including three national parks and five Areas of Outstanding Natural Beauty (AONB). The national parks being: Snowdonia, Pembrokeshire Coast, and Brecon Beacons, and the AONBs of: Anglesey, the Clwydian Range and Dee Valley, Gower Peninsula, Llŷn Peninsula, and Wye Valley (partially in England). Wales also has many locations categorised as Site of Special Scientific Interest, Special Area of Conservation, Special Protection Area and local nature reserve. There are many zoos and gardens, including the National Botanic Garden of Wales.

On the coast, a great diversity of species such as seals, dolphins, sharks, jellyfish, crabs and lobsters can be found. There are also seabird colonies on the islands near the coast. Species which can only be found in Wales are the Radnor lily and a type of fish, the gwyniad, only found in Lake Bala. The rare fen orchid (Liparis loeselii) is one of the most threatened species in northwestern Europe and has vanished from many places in Wales. The Welsh Government funds Natural Resources Wales (NRW), Plantlife, Bridgend County Borough Council and the Wales Biodiversity Partnership coastal ecosystem group to help reconstruct its natural habitat and secure the future of this threatened species.

The Welsh Government works closely with the Wales Biodiversity Partnership (WBP) which promotes and monitors the Wales biodiversity action plan. In 2010 the Welsh government launched a Natural Environment Framework, "A Living Wales", which focuses on sustainable land and marine management in Wales. The Environment (Wales) Act 2016 put into place a range of powers and duties designed to enable the natural resources of Wales to be planned and management in a more sustainable, pro-active and joined-up way than was previously possible.

Elements

Floral biodiversity

Trees
The sessile oak (Quercus petraea), one of Wales' most common species, can be found across the region. English holly (Ilex aquifolium), one of the few native evergreen trees, can be found in southern Wales. The wych elm (Ulmus glabra), a native species, suffers from disease and competition introduced by exotic species.

Flowers
The cuckoo flower (Cardamine pratensis), a herbaceous perennial, can be found throughout Wales. Bog rosemary (Andromeda polifolia), a small flowering shrub, can be found in central Wales. Within the British Isles, the Snowdon lily (Gagea serotina) is found only on the slopes of Snowdon.

Important Plant Areas
Important Plant Areas (IPAs) in Wales are areas of "the highest botanical importance" as determined by Plantlife.

Faunal diversity

Marine
Around Cardigan Bay and Pembrokeshire coast, minke and pilot whales are common in the summer while fin and killer whales are rare. Bottlenose dolphins are common and Risso’s dolphin and Atlantic white-sided dolphin are rare. Whales, grey seals, basking sharks and sunfish can also be seen.

Mammals

Roe deer (Capreolus capreolus) and fallow deer (Dama dama) are the two largest mammal species in Wales. Roe deer are found in central and northern Wales. Fallow deer are found in rural and semiurban areas of Wales. The European polecat (Mustela putorius) can be found in both urban and country environments. Found in the same area is the red fox, one of the most common mammals in Wales.

The red deer, one of five native deer species, is the biggest non-marine mammal in Wales. (Although native populations of deer have long been extinct). Fallow, muntjac roe and sika deer can also be found. pine martens are very rarely seen. Other mammals include badgers, foxes, hares, hedgehogs, otters, rabbits, stoats, weasels, red squirrels, and 13 species of bat.

Birds

About 430 species of birds have been found in Wales. Red kites and ospreys are some "signature species" of Wales. Dippers, choughs, puffins, guillemots, razorbills, short-eared owls, Manx shearwaters, whimbrel and plovers are also common. Montagu's harrier (Circus pygargus), a rare species in Britain, has several nesting places in Wales. Red grouse (Lagopus lagopus scotica), once a common species, has reduced population dramatically due to human hunting. Red grouse can be found at the extreme north part of Wales.

Reptiles
Adders, common lizards, notably around Oxwich Bay and grass snakes have been recorded. Some sand lizards bred by Herpetological Conservation Trust volunteers and Chester and Jersey Zoos have been released into the wild.

Priority Species

Endemism

Trees

Native species include ash, birch, oak, willow, holly, juniper, Scots pine and yew. Planting and conservation of natives species is encouraged, because they tend to better survive the local environment. They also help balance the biodiversity and provide wood and timbers.

Flowering plants
Ash, service tree, wild leeks, Tenby daffodil.

Bryophytes
Wales has over 300 species of mosses and liverworts.

The endangered species are: Bartramia stricta, Cryphaea lamyana, Ditrichum plumbicola, Hamatocaulis vernicosus, Pallavicinia lyellii, Petalophyllum ralfsii, Riccia huebeneriana and Sematophyllum demissum.

Mammals
Lesser horseshoe bat (Rhinolophus hipposideros)
Red squirrels

Birds
Hen harrier
Black grouse
Curlew
Golden plover

Reptiles
There are five native reptiles in Wales. These include grass snakes, sand lizards, common lizards and slowworms.

Amphibians
There are six native amphibians in Wales. They are the common toad, great crested newt, natterjack toad, palmate newt, smooth newt and common frog.

Invertebrates
An estimated 25,000 invertebrate species live in land and freshwater habitats in Wales.

Human impact
Welsh biodiversity has been reduced by human activity. Many native species were lost because of lack of woodland support.

Animals
Many conservation projects have been set up to preserve the red squirrel. There is a great decline in the number of hedgehogs. The use of pesticides has cause a major decline of honeybees; a Pollinator Action plan was launched at the Royal Welsh Show in July 2012.

Management
Wales has 175 species on the Section 74 list of Species of Principal Importance for the Conservation of Biological Diversity. However, the list of species and habitats of principal importance in Wales is now based on new legislation in the form of sections 6 and 7 of the Environment (Wales) 2016 Act. In Wales, the United Kingdom Biodiversity Action Plan (UKBAP) was implemented by the Wales Biodiversity Partnership (WBP). The Countryside Council for Wales also assists in sustainability management.

Wales Biodiversity Partnership (WBP) organises the overall plan, and on a local scale, each council carries out its own surveys and reports back, then produces management and protection plants for the identified species and habitats.

The Welsh government cooperates with European Community directives on the conservation of wild birds and natural habitats and wild flora and fauna as well as with NATURA 2000.

Gallery

See also

Biodiversity 
Flora of Wales
Animals of Wales

Areas 
List of local nature reserves in Wales
National nature reserves in Wales
Protected areas of Wales
List of Special Areas of Conservation in Wales
List of habitats of principal importance in Wales

Organisations 
Wildlife Trust of South and West Wales
North Wales Wildlife Trust

Law 
Wildlife law in England and Wales
List of invasive non-native species in England and Wales

References

Further reading
Wales Biodiversity Group, Future biodiversity action in Wales: advice to the National Assembly for Wales on the UK Millennium Biodiversity Report, Wales Biodiversity Group, 2002. , .
David Hill, Matthew Fasham, Graham Tucker, Michael Shewry, Philip Shaw, Handbook of Biodiversity Methods: Survey, Evaluation and Monitoring, Cambridge University Press, 2005. , .
National Museums & Galleries of Wales. Dept. of Biodiversity and Systematic Biology, Biodiversity Wales: Species of Conservation Or Special Interest to Wales, National Museums & Galleries of Wales, 2005. , .
Great Britain: Department for Environment, Food and Rural Affairs, The UK Government Sustainable Development Strategy, The Stationery Office, 2005. , .
Jon Moore, An Atlas of Marine Biodiversity Action Plan Species and Habitats in Wales: A Report for Countryside Council for Wales, Countryside Council for Wales, 2001.
Mike Alexander, Management Planning for Nature Conservation: A Theoretical Basis & Practical Guide, Springer, 2008. , .
P. Selman, PLANNING AT THE LANDSCAPE SCALE, Routledge, 2006. , .
Niles Eldredge, Life on Earth: An Encyclopedia of Biodiversity, Ecology, and Evolution, ABC-CLIO, 2002. , .
George W. Cox, Alien Species and Evolution: The Evolutionary Ecology of Exotic Plants, Animals, Microbes, and Interacting Native Species, Island Press, 2004. , .

Journal articles
Paul A. Ashton and Richard J. Abbott (1992), "Multiple origins and genetic diversity in the newly arisen allopolyploid species, Senecio cambrensis Rosser (Compositae)", Heredity 68, 25–32; doi:10.1038/hdy.1992.3.
Richard J. Abbott, Andrew J. Lowe (2004), "Origins, establishment and evolution of new polyploid species: Senecio cambrensis and S. eboracensis in the British Isles", Biological Journal of the Linnean Society, Volume 82, Issue 4, pages 467–474, August 2004. DOI: 10.1111/j.1095-8312.2004.00333.x.
John L. Harper, J. N. Clatworthy, I. H. McNaughton and G. R. Sagar (1961), "The Evolution and Ecology of Closely Related Species Living in the Same Area", Evolution, Vol. 15, No. 2 (Jun. 1961), pp. 209–227.
K. M. Dlugosch, I. M. Parker (2007), "Founding events in species invasions: genetic variation, adaptive evolution, and the role of multiple introductions″, Molecular Ecology, Volume 17, Issue 1, pages 431–449, January 2008, DOI: 10.1111/j.1365-294X.2007.03538.x.
Peter R. Sheldon (1987), "Parallel gradualistic evolution of Ordovician trilobites", Nature 330, 561 – 563 (10 December 1987); doi:10.1038/330561a0.
Denis W. Gartside and Thomas McNeilly (1974), "The potential for evolution of heavy metal tolerance in plants″, Heredity (1974) 32, 335–348; doi:10.1038/hdy.1974.42.
S. N. Raina and H. Rees (1983), "DNA variation between and within chromosome complements of vicia species", Heredity (1983) 51, 335–346; doi:10.1038/hdy.1983.38.
R. K. J. Narayan (1982), "Discontinuous DNA Variation in the Evolution of Plant Species: The Genus Lathyrus", Evolution Vol. 36, No. 5 (Sep. 1982), pp. 877–891.
R. K. J. Naravan and A. Durrant (1983),  "DNA distribution in chromosomes ofLathyrus species", Genetica Volume 61, Number 1 (1983), 47–53, DOI: 10.1007/BF00563231.
Kathy H. Hodder and James M. Bullock (1997), "Translocations of Native Species in the UK: Implications for Biodiversity", Journal of Applied Ecology Vol. 34, No. 3 (Jun. 1997), pp. 547–565.

External links

Tools
 GLOBIO, an ongoing programme to map the past, current and future impacts of human activities on biodiversity
 World Map of Biodiversity an interactive map from the United Nations Environment Programme World Conservation Monitoring Centre

Resources
 Automatic acoustic Monitoring and Inventorying of BIOdiversity
 Barcode Wales
 Biodiversity headlines from thinktanksreport – Latest reports, research and opinion on biodiversity.
 Biodiversity Heritage Library – Open access digital library of taxonomic literature.
 
 Countryside Council for Wales
 Encyclopedia of Life  – Documenting all species of life on earth.
 Economics of Species protection & Management
 Local Records Centres Wales
 National Biodiversity Network  – National Biodiversity Network Gateway.
 Tree of Life  – Relationships & characteristics of all life on earth.
 Wales Biodiversity Partnership

Wales
Coast of Wales
Conservation in Wales
National nature reserves in Wales
Protected areas of Wales
Regional parks of the United Kingdom